Rudic may refer to:

Rudic (surname)
Rudić (surname)
Ruđić (brotherhood)